John Stackhouse was an administrator of the English East India Company. He served as the company's governor of the Bengal Presidency in the eighteenth century.

References

Presidents of Bengal
English businesspeople
Administrators in British India
18th-century British people
1741 deaths